Katsutarō, Katsutaro, Katsutaroh or Katsutarou (written: 勝太郎) is a masculine Japanese given name. Notable people with the name include:

, Japanese serial killer 
, Japanese businessman and film producer
, Japanese geisha and singer
, Japanese sumo wrestler

Japanese masculine given names